Classic soul is a radio format that focuses on the more raw types of soul music from the 1950s-1970s that draw from certain rhythm and blues and soul music influences, after 1980 is generally considered  “contemporary R&B” with the smoother and more sophisticated styles, the split is mostly indicated by Michael Jackson's 1979 album Off the Wall, which is considered to sit at the nexus of disco, funk, pop, soul, classic R&B, and contemporary R&B.

Genres
the 1950s Rhythm and blues - artists such as Fats Domino and Ray Charles
Motown - artists such as The Temptations and Smokey Robinson
1960s soul music - artists such as The Delfonics and James Brown
doo-wop - artists such as Little Anthony and the Imperials and The Shirelles
funk - artists such as Kool & the Gang and Rick James
disco - artists such as Earth, Wind and Fire and Donna Summer
1970s soul music - artists such as Marvin Gaye and Barry White

In media 
 The film The Commitments is about some Irish young people starting a band who sing Classic Soul

Example Songs

See also 
Urban oldies
 The Craig Charles Funk and Soul Show

External links
Classic Soul Network

Radio formats
Soul music